E&F Miler Industries (formerly Miler Coaster, Inc. and Miler Manufacturing) is a family-owned roller coaster manufacturing firm based in Portland, Oregon, United States. The company specialises in smaller children's roller coasters; however, it has manufactured some larger family roller coasters in the past.

History
In the late 1940s Carl Miler founded Miler Manufacturing. The company built a variety steel roller coasters aimed at children and families such as Wild Mouse roller coasters. Miler Manufacturing roller coasters were popular in the 1950s. Production of new roller coasters by Miler Manufacturing stopped in the mid 1970s.

Carl Miler's son, Fred Miler, reopened Miler Manufacturing in 1989. The company changed its name to Miler Coaster, Inc. in 1992 when its first new roller coaster was built. The company's name was later changed to E&F Miler Industries. As of 2013, Fred Miler operates the company with his son, Eric Miler.

List of roller coasters

As of 2019, E&F Miler Industries have manufactured a total of 58 roller coasters which have operated at 89 different locations. Under the Miler Manufacturing name they have manufactured a total of 30 roller coasters which have operated at 38 different locations. Aside from installing new roller coasters, E&F Miler Industries has performed work on restoring some of Miler Manufacturing's original rides. The majority of the company's contracts come from the International Association of Amusement Parks and Attractions' (IAAPA) annual trade show.

E&F Miler Industries / Miler Coaster, Inc.

Miler Manufacturing

Gallery

See also
 List of companies based in Oregon

References

External links

 
 
 

Roller coaster manufacturers
Manufacturing companies based in Portland, Oregon
Privately held companies based in Oregon
Companies established in the 1940s
Roller coaster designers
1940s establishments in Oregon
Family-owned companies of the United States